Lieberman, Liebermann, or Liberman are names deriving from Lieb, a German and Jewish (Ashkenazic) nickname for a person from the German lieb or Yiddish lib, meaning 'dear, beloved'. Many Lieberman families originally spelled the name in Hebrew or Cyrillic characters, so variations in the spelling occurred during transliteration to the Latin alphabet.

Liebermann 
 Benjamin Liebermann, German manufacturer
 Carl Theodore Liebermann (1842–1914), German chemist
 Charles H. Liebermann, Russian-American physician
 Eliezer Dob Liebermann, Russian-Jewish writer
 Felix Liebermann, historian (brother to Max Liebermann)
 Lowell Liebermann, composer
 Max Liebermann, painter
 Oren Liebermann, American-Israeli journalist
 Rolf Liebermann, composer and opera director

Lieberman 
 Avigdor Lieberman, Moldavian-born Israeli politician, former Minister of Foreign affairs
 Daniel Lieberman, paleoanthropologist 
 Evelyn S. Lieberman, American public official
 Fredric Lieberman, an American ethnomusicologist, composer, music professor, and author
 Hadassah Lieberman, wife of Joe Lieberman
 Hendel Lieberman, Russian-American artist
 Herman Lieberman, Polish lawyer and Socialist politician
 Jeff Lieberman (born 1947), American filmmaker
 Jeffrey Lieberman, American psychiatrist, Chairman, Department of Psychiatry, Columbia University
 Joe Lieberman, US Senator from Connecticut, husband of Hadassah Lieberman
 Jon Lieberman, reporter and producer
 Judith Lieberman, educator and the wife of Saul Lieberman
 Lori Lieberman, American singer-songwriter
 Lou Lieberman, Australian politician
 Louise Lieberman (born 1977), American soccer coach and former player
 Nancy Lieberman (born 1958), American basketball player
 Philip Lieberman, linguist
 Robert Lieberman, film and television director
 Robert C. Lieberman, American political scientist
 Robert H. Lieberman, scientist, educator, novelist and movie director
 Saul Lieberman, rabbi and scholar and the husband of Judith Lieberman
 Syd Lieberman, storyteller
 Zvi Lieberman, Hebrew children's book author

Liberman 
 Alexander Liberman, a Russian-American publisher, painter, and sculptor
 Alvin Liberman, professor of psychology and director of Haskins Laboratories
 Anatoly Liberman, professor of linguistics, etymology, and folklore
 Evsei Liberman, Soviet economist
 Jim Liberman, American drag racer
 M. Charles Liberman, professor of Otology and Laryngology at Harvard Medical School
 Mark Liberman, professor of linguistics
 Simcha Liberman, Talmudist
 Tetiana Liberman, Ukrainian singer

Fictional characters
Claire Lieberman, the female lead in The Adventures of Young Indiana Jones film Young Indiana Jones and the Hollywood Follies.

References

See also 
 The Lieberman clause

 Related surnames
 Libermann
 Liebmann, Liebman, Libman

German-language surnames
Jewish surnames
Yiddish-language surnames